Dilekkaya is a village in the District of Kozan, Adana Province, Turkey. Dilekkaya lies next to the ruins of ancient Anazarva.

References

Villages in Kozan District